Giovanni Luca Barberi (1452–1520) was an Italian historian, lawyer and notary. He was born and lived in Sicily all of his life.

His writing was particularly important in compiling  the list of feudal and noble titles in Sicilian history.

Works

Bibliography
 Davide Alessandra, L'eredità di Giovan Luca Barberi 1523-1579, in Archivio Storico per la Sicilia Orientale, n. 2, FrancoAngeli, 2018
 Enrico Mazzarese Fardella, J. Luca de Barberiis Liber de secretiis, Giuffrè, 1966
 Lelio I. Prestifilippo. Tesi di Laurea. Un esemplare del "magnum capibrevium" di Giovan Luca Barberi. I feudi di Agira, Assoro, Barrafranca, Cerami, Gagliano e Pietraperzia. Università degli Studi di Catania, Facoltà di Giurisprudenza, Academic year 1993/94 (supervisor Prof. F. Migliorino)
 G. Catalano. Studi sulla Legatia Apostolica in Sicilia. Edizioni Parallelo 38, Reggio Calabria 1973
 G. Silvestri. I Capibrevi di Giovanni Luca Barberi. Società Siciliana per la Storia Patria, Tipografie Michele Amenta, Palermo 1879-1888, ristampa anastatica, Palermo 1985
Volume 1 - I feudi di Val di Noto, 1879.
Volume 2 - I feudi di Val Demone, 1886.
Volume 3 - I feudi di Val di Mazzara, 1888.

See also
Monarchia Sicula

15th-century Italian historians
Italian notaries
15th-century Italian lawyers
Writers from Sicily
1452 births
1520 deaths
16th-century Italian historians
16th-century Italian lawyers